Dana Salah (IPA Arabic pronunciation: daː[b]naː[b] sˤ[e]laː[b]ħ) is a Jordanian-Palestinian singer, songwriter, and producer.

Life and career 

Salah was born and raised in Amman, Jordan, where she started writing music at the age of 9. Following her education at Duke University, she pursued her music career in New York City. There, her single "Move That Body," garnered over 11 million streams on Spotify, reached #6 on the US iTunes Dance charts, and peaked at #25 on the Billboard Dance charts.

She returned to Jordan in hopes of enriching her roots. In 2020 she released her first Arabic single, "Weino," under the name Dana Salah, which generated over 1 million views on YouTube and was added to more than 1000 personal playlists on Spotify.

Salah's next single “TanTan” trended #2 on YouTube and was featured on Mexico's ISATV Channel and Metro Station.

In 2022 Salah became a Spotify EQUAL ambassador, making her the first female Jordanian artist to be featured on a Billboard in Times Square.

References 

Jordanian women singers
Duke University alumni
Year of birth missing (living people)
Living people